Roughwood may refer to:

 Roughwood (Brookline, Massachusetts), listed on the NRHP in Massachusetts
 Roughwood (Easttown Township, Pennsylvania), listed on the NRHP in Chester County, Pennsylvania